Zilet (also Romanized as Z̄īlet and Zīlet; also known as Zelet and Zelīt) is a village in Nowkand Kola Rural District, in the Central District of Qaem Shahr County, Mazandaran Province, Iran. At the 2006 census, its population was 557, in 140 families.

References 

Populated places in Qaem Shahr County